Clan MacInnes is a Scottish clan originally from the western highlands of Scotland. The origin of clan (MacInnes, McInnes, or in Gaelic: Mhic Aonghais or MacAonghais) is Morvern and Ardgour, Argylshire, with its clan name coming into existence in the 13th century. The clan's chief and his heirs were assassinated in the 14th century meaning that the clan no longer has a clan chief. Clan MacInnes is not associated - in any way - with the Clan Innes which hails from Moray (see "Related Names" below).

The clan has two mottos and crests (one of which is disputed), that were both devised in the mid-19th century along with the clan's tartans, when a great revival of all things Scottish was underway. In 2004 a new motto and crest was matriculated by Lord Lyon and granted to the International Association of Clan MacInnes members for their use. The International Association of Clan MacInnes does not represent international members of the clan and is an American organization. 

The clan's plant badge is 'holly'; possibly referring to the indigenous Morvern tribe called the Creones, who were later given the distinction 'The Red Berry People'.

History

Origins of the name

From the Gaelic Mac Aonghais or mhic Aonghais (Sons of Angus). Mac or Mc (as they are interchangeable) means son or family of, aon means one or unique, and gusa means choice. Therefore, 'Unique Choice' or 'Chosen One'. Mac does not imply strict blood-lines, but could reflect kinship, dependent allies or tenants.

Whilst a mythical 7th century kindred named Cenél nÓengusa of Islay appears in the Senchus fer n-Alban - ('The History of the Men of Scotland' - an Old Irish medieval text believed to have been compiled from a 10th century document, and then transposed and possibly added to in the 14th century that is now being seriously questioned as to its truth), so too do four other kin groups with the same kindred naming that were earlier, or contemporary, from Northern Ireland. They are the Cenél nÓengusa of Eochaid Muinremuir mac Oengus, Rí na Dál Riata; Cenél nÓengusa of Uí Echach Cobo; Cenél nÓengusa of Fergnae mac Oengusso Ibdaig; and Cenél nÓengusa or Mag Aonghusa. None of them have any bearing on the origin of the clan name of mhic Aonghais, (MacInnes).

And so two question has more recently been, "Where did the name come from given that it would have been contemporary with the rise in power of the Lordship of the Isles, and the introduction of clan names in the 13th century?" and secondly "Who had Clann MacInneses clansmen descended from?" In weighing the evidence regarding the first question there are several legitimate possibilities that stand-out before any clansman need get involved in believing ‘invented tradition.’

The first option is that the name "mhic Aonghais", (MacInnes), as the 'sons of Angus', may well have originated with either Aonghais Mor (d.1294) or Aonghais Og (d.c.1330), (Somerled's great, grandson, or great, great, grandson), with surnaming contemporary around the time of Aonghais Mor, and as a name bequeathed in support of the newly named Clann Donald, who the tribe adhered to. As the first chief of Clann Donald - Aonghais Mor (d.1294) was styled Angus of Islay (as was Aonghais Og). This name may have found synergy later after the writing of the Senchus fer n-Alban in the 14th century) with a suspected fictitious Cenél nÓengusa of Islay that were purported to have existed in the 7th century. The Senchus was recorded (supposedly faithfully) by Lúcás Ó Dalláin as Chief Sennachie and Bard of the Uí Maine. He may have known that a number of the Scottish Dal Riata migrants (as genetics now proves), were related back to the Ui Maine prior to the settling of the western seaboard of Scotland and the formation of the Scottish kingdom of Dal Riata, or he may have been intent on cementing an expanded foundation story that could link the Uí Maine to the Dal Riatan settlement in what would become Scotland.

The second option is that the name originated with a kindred chief by the name of Aonghais from Morven. One possibility was the chief who was said to have been killed shortly prior to the tribe's request to Somerled as a Norse-Gael for him to lead them as a war-band against invading Lochlann (Vikings).

Third, the name could well have come from a kindred Iona abbot with the given name of Aonghais, or it could have been in recognition of the kindred's support of an abbot named Aonghais, along with the kindred's association with Iona harking back to the time of Columba. In this case, the prefix of ‘Mac’ may be referring to its definition as that of a ‘devotee.’

Fourth, the name could well hark back to the clan's original roots as remembered by the Church, (or by Somerled's Macdonald descendants), as having originally been a resident group of tribal Creones, or ‘Picts’, (for want of a better term), and thus remembered as the ‘sons of Oengus’ in reference to the renowned Pict king Oengus I. He was the kindred's over-king for a considerable period of time in the 9th century and they may have supported Oenghus I, or his brother, in battle in Loch Linnhe against further encroachment by those from Lorne.

Lastly, the created link to the 7th century Cenel n'Oenghusa on Islay could not have been made until after the recording of the Senchus fer n-Alban. It may therefore have come from Church records in the 13th century, or orally, with a belief of there had been an earlier mythical Cenél nÓengusa. With no known connection to them, other than they knew that some of them had originally arrived from Ireland. It seems unlikely that the term Cenel n'Oenghsa as kindred name would have survived from the 7th century as naming at that time only lasted with father and son, (e.g. Oengus had a son Iain and he would be known as Iain mac Oengus (of the 'Cenel'or kin of Oengus) Iain's son Brion would be known as Brion mac Iain, or Cenel n'Iain). It therefore seems that the Cenel n'Oenghusa were a later invention. If this was the case the clan would have had to take at face value a name based on ’invented tradition’ unless someone knew the oral genealogy all the way back to the 7th century which is doubtful. The Cenel n'Oenghusa description in the Senchus is not without difficulties and is today seriously questioned as to its historical validity. The clan certainly adopted this link in mid 19th-century, but for an entirely different reason. It was at this time during a renaissance in all things 'Gaelic' that several adopted supposed traditional yet mythical account of the origins of many of the clans, (including MacInnes and Macdonald), to show that they linked back to the kings of Ireland and entities such as 'Conn of a Hundred Battles' and 'Niall of the Nine Hostages', that had been politically purported earlier.

The name comes from the Gaelic MacAonghais, literally "Sons of Angus": Mac means son or family of. Aon means one or unique. ... In addition, Masters, MacMaster, McNiesh are considered septs of the Clan.

Origins of the Clan
The mythical account of the origin of Clan MacInnes', therefore, has their ancestors among the early inhabitants of Islay, Jura and not of the Kintyre peninsula in Scotland, and generally in part of the region known as Argyll. These Scotti, a Celtic, Gaelic-speaking people, supposedly first appeared there as settlers from Ireland in c.500 when Fergus Mór, king of the north Irish kingdom of Dál Riata, and his two purported brothers, Loarn and Óengus, expanded their lands into southwestern Alba. Óengus had supposedly already established a colony on Islay, and / or Jura, before Fergus's arrival. This kindred, (that at that time would have only extended over two generations name-wise), was then considered in the mid 19th century, to be the first of the MacInnes clan. Given this fiction, it was then added, that the original Óengus must have also been buried on Iona. The account of this Óengus, (or Cenél nÓengusa), as the originator of Clan MacInnes is, in all reality, 19th century 'invented tradition'. It thus needs to be consigned to legend with clan members made aware of the truth regarding their clan's likely 13th-century name origin.

What we definitely now believe is that the clan, (at the time it was awarded its name in the 13th century of Clan mhic Aonghais - MacInnes)), was from Morvern, Argyleshire, (the peninsula bounded by Loch Sunart and Loch Linnhe and adjacent to the Isle of Mull), and that as a kindred, or tribe, it was made up of three distinct earlier ancestral groups. It is also now evident from DNA testing that the largest grouping who made up the kindred prior to its naming certainly had their origin/s in Northern Ireland as Irish 'Scoti (but not from any purported Cenél nÓengusa on Islay). It appears from genetic distance (GD) calculations that some of these kindred were likely to have migrated to Scotland prior to 500 AD, while others no doubt arrived with the creation of the Scottish 'kingdom of Dal Riata, (Dalriada), in Argyle after 500 AD, (or possibly with St Columba in the mid 6th-century), or later.

Evident from MacInnes DNA testing, also, is that the next kin group in size was already based in Morvern at the time of the formation of the Scoti 'kingdom of Dal Riata'. They had resided there since c.2000 BC, (or earlier), and like the Irish Scoti they were also genetically Y-DNA Haplotype R1b from an earlier Beaker culture. These were the people from the tribe that the Greco Roman geographer Ptolemy referred to in c.150 AD as the 'Creones', (later known as 'Picts'). Given that the Irish Sea had created no great barrier over time to these seagoing people those from the northeast of Ireland (that by that time may have included Cruithne and Irish Scoti from Ireland). They had assimilated over the centuries with western seaboard indigenous 'Pictish' peoples and their culture but not in large numbers. This more than likely had been occurring for millennia as we now know from the Rathlin Island Beaker burial finds. It was out of these early times, and then following the arrival of Christianity and St, Columba in the 6th century, that several of this kindred attached themselves to the Church on what had been their ancestral isle, now named Iona. It is believed that tribal members, (later MacInneses), lived on Iona with Columba, with tradition recalling that a number of the kindred's chiefs were buried there. MacInnes tradition also says that Columba selected the site where the Kiel Church now stands in Lochaline, Morvern, on Creone tribal land.

From the 6th century these two groups continued to form an infused Gaelic kindred with others along the western seaboard, (from Ardnamurchan south to Kintyre, and under various Pict or Scoti over-lords), until their next challenge appeared in the form of marauding Vikings at the end of the 8th century. This was the third group that would add their genetic make-up to the clan, (other than other minor assimilated DNA types not mentioned here - Refer to the Clan MacInnes Association DNA project results). It also appears from genetics that many in Morvern were taken as slaves by invading Vikings over time to be spread from Ireland to Europe and beyond with a later variety of differing foreign surnames. 

These Vikings were the Norse or Danes of Y-DNA Haplotype R1a, that is the haplotype of Somerled mac Gillebride's line. His Norse Gilli ancestors would be the tribe's ruling overlords (on behalf of the Norse Earl of Orkney since the time of Sigurd the Stout) administering their domains from the island of Colonsay. MacInnes tradition places their Morvern kindred very close to, (if not related on the female side), to this Jarl Gille line, with one Gille traditionally believed to have been a mhic Aonghais chief. It appears by this time that many of the tribe became Gall-Ghàidheil, or Norse Gael warriors.  

Pushed out of his title and the isles by other invading Vikings in the late 11th, or early 12th-century, Gille Admonan's son Gillebride, (along with his son Somerled), lived for a period in the caves on Morvern with the clan's (tribe's) kindred. Following Gillebride's death in Ireland, Somerled (d.1164) returned to Morvern when the time was right. As an alliance later known as Siol Gillebride, or 'Seed of the Servant of St. Bride', (that included those who would later become the clans of MacInnes, MacGillivray, the sept of MacMaster and clan MacEacharn), and under the leadership of Somerled, they managed to expel their Viking enemies from their lands. This was the start of a change in Somerled's fortunes with his descendants going on to become Lords of the Isles. Somerled's daughter Bethoc would become the first Prioress of Iona, while his grandsons were the first of the lines of Clan Donald and Mac Dougall.

It was around this time that Clan MacInnes was awarded its name as mhic Aonghais (MacInnes). Whether its definition as the 'sons of chosen one' was known at that time is a moot point. From this time Clan MacInnes chiefs would go on to have a close association with Clan Donald, with their last clan chief being a foster father to one of the sons of the First Lord of the Isles, John of Islay. It was this MacInnes chief's unfortunate advice to John of Islay that would see his, and the clan's, downfall. In recommending that John should divorce his wife Amie MacRuari in favour of the daughter of the future King Robert II of Scotland, the MacInnes chief made a fatal error in not considering that Amie's scorn was likely to be served cold. Amie, thus, later got her revenge by telling her ex-husband that MacInnes had continually complained after being lodged in John's residence, (Ardtornish Castle, Morvern), that the place stank like a dog's kennel. This slight against John's good name, and his position as First Lord of the Isles, was enough for him to react by ordering the punishment of MacInnes to be left in the hands of Donald MacLean (son of Lachlan Maclean of Duart), thus hopefully killing two birds with one stone. Lachlan had expressed a prior interest in the MacInnes lands in Morvern and Lochaber and perhaps John of Islay saw this as a way of also repaying a previous debt. And so in the mid 14th-century the Clan MacInnes chief, along with his sons, were assassinated by the MacLeans, thus preventing any future claims of title by Clan MacInnes. As an outcome, MacLean was awarded the old MacInnes lands along with the MacInnes castle of Ardgour.

Following the MacInnes chief's untimely death many of the clan scattered to Ardnamurchan, Moidart, Lochaber Appin, Craignish, and even Glencoe. Then following the demise of the Lordship of the Isles in the late 15th century, a number moved to the Isle of Skye under the protection of MacDonald of Sleat, who by that time they recognised as their rightful Laird, and his entitlement to the title as Lord of the Isles; and under the protection of MacKinnon of Strath. Five longships are said to have made the journey, each holding a family group, and it is from these five families that are descended the five lineages of the name of MacInnes on the Isle of Skye.

Remaining clan kin in Morvern continued to now act as vassals occupying the keep of Kinlochaline in Lochaline that had been built some say the MacInneses. By this time the keep was in Campbell hands and many remaining dispossessed clan members thus supported Clan Dugall Craignish while others migrated with some to Perthshire where they joined the MacGregors. This move lead to an ill-informed claim that MacInnes was a sept of MacGregor.

Associated Clan Keep or Castle Tower - Kinlochaline "the butter castle"
 
This castle is on Morvern, on the west edge of Scotland, just across from the Isle of Mull. The castle occupies a commanding position atop a rocky summit at the head of Loch Aline, overlooking a small peaty stream called Gear Abhain, or short river. The stream runs by the castle into Loch Aline then finally into the Sound of Mull. The area at one time had long been occupied by Clan MacInnes. Clan MacInnes was keeper of the castle, which may have been used as a hold for supplies. Clan MacInnes and MacMaster's remained as keepers of the castle after the lands were granted to MacLean by charter.

It was said that one of the Clan women, Dubh-Chal (Lady of the Black Veil), paid the architect an amount of butter equal in size to the castle, thus the name Caisteal an Ime or castle of butter. The main fireplace has a carving of a woman holding an object in one hand that some assume is Dubh-Chal. The new owners had the carving painted in the same style as it may have been originally. Dubh-Chal is buried at the Kiels (Kiel Church) along with (reported) several Chieftains and the mother of St. Columba.

The castle is noteworthy in the size of the boulders that were used to construct its walls. The castle is four stories tall, measures 43 x 34 feet and has walls which are ten feet thick. Most of the stones in the walls are composed of Lias limestone which contains fossils, very rare in Scotland. Because of its size, it is not known for sure if the castle was actually occupied or used as a keep. The ramparts were made for pouring boiling oil with the unique feature of firepits in the ramparts.

The outside holds a carving of what appears to be a fish, a salmon. Some have theorized that this is the salmon that Somerled wanted the MacInnes men to catch for him before he led them to oust the Norsemen that were terrorizing the settlement. The story of Somerled can be found here http://macinnes.org/somerled/somerled.html.

In 1645, during the English Civil War, the Kinlochaline castle was attacked and burned by Alasdair Mac Colla, "Colkitto" serving under James Graham, 1st Marquess of Montrose, as a member of Clan Graham. Clan MacInnes retained control of the castle following this attack, and also after a later attack in 1679 during a feud with the Archibald Campbell, 9th Earl of Argyll. The castle, which was then heavily damaged, was abandoned by Clan MacInnes around 1690.

Jacobite Uprisings

In the Jacobite rising of 1745 - known as the '45', while MacDonald of Sleat sat on the fence with his MacInnes forces who wanted to join Charles Edward Stuart, other MacInnes clansmen took up arms on both sides of the fight. Some supported Campbells and the House of Argyll, while the MacInneses of Morvern, Lochaber and Appin, supported Prince Charles Edward Stuart and fought beside Stewart of Ardshiel, who commanded of the Appin (Stewart) Regiment. Several with MacKinnon of Strath on Skye also supported the Prince. A MacInnes clansman, MacMaster of Glenaladale, raised Prince Charles banner at Glenfinnan. Four MacInnes men were killed and two wounded at the battle of Culloden with others were likely captured and subsequently hanged. Donald Livingstone, the 18-year-old son of Anna MacInnes of Morvern, saved the Appin Banner from Culloden and smuggled it home. The banner is now housed in the Museum of Scotland. These kinsmen are buried in the cemetery of Kiel Kirk (Kiel Church) in Lochaline Morvern. This church and cemetery still exist today with many of the older gravestones housed in the session house next to the church. Another hardy individual, John McInnes from Elgol on Skye, helped row Prince Charles to safety. Following his capture by the 'Black Captain' James Fergussone of the 'bomb' HMS Furnace, he was given 500 lashes, (in instalments of 50), in an attempt to have him tell of the Bonny Prince's whereabouts. After refusing to divulge any details he was left for dead in Loch na Dal, from where, after his recovery, he would marry into a MacInnes family from Leitir Fura, Sleat.

The French Indian Wars (1754–63) - American Revolutionary War (1775–1783) - and the Napoleonic Wars (1801-1815)

Following Culloden numbers of MacInnes clansman joined the British Army with several participating in The French and Indian War that comprised the North American theater of the worldwide Seven Years' War of 1756–63. Following this period several of the clan settled North Carolina. These settlers, along with several of their descendants back in Scotland, went on to fight in the American Revolutionary War in South and North Carolina, New York and Halifax, and finally at Yorktown, that resulted in Cornwallis's eventual surrender in 1781. Other MacInnes clansmen back in Scotland then joined up and fought in the Napoleonic Wars, including many of the campaigns in Spain, at the Heights of Spain, and finally at Quatre Bras and Waterloo in 1815.

Smuggling

A family of MacInneses from Leitir Fura in Sleat, (that overlooks the Sound of Sleat), became notorious smugglers of brandy and rum from France in the latter half of the 18th-century. They supplied not just the Isle of Skye, but many of the Outer Hebrides, until their 'tack' was terminated in the 1790s.

The Highland Clearances
From the mid-1700s to the second half of the 19th century the Highland Clearances, would drive many MacInnes kin from their homes with voluntary, or forced, emigration, (notably on Skye and Mull, but later in Morvern). These Clearances were designed to get the tenant farmers off the land to make room for more profitable Cheviot sheep. Higher rents, poverty, and crop failures, (such as the potato blights and famines of the 1840s), also contributed to the tide of emigration that emptied the highlands during the 19th Century. Numerous parish cemeteries in Morvern, Lochaber, Appin, Glencoe, and throughout Argyll, Ardnamurchan, Moidart, on Mull, Iona and Skye, all bear testament to these unfortunate times.

Following the Highland Clearances
Whilst clan members still live throughout Scotland, England, many migrating families now have loyal clan members where they now live in The United States of America, Canada (Nova Scotia), Australia, New Zealand, and other countries around the world. In line with the International Association of Clan MacInnes motto: "MacAonghais a-rithist!",('Again MacInnes!') they adhere to the Scottish saying that, "A Scot is a Scot to a Hundred Generations."

Crests

This first crest and motto harks back to a legendary 13th-century story from Morvern or Ardgour and an incident when a MacInnes clansman was awakened by a bee to lead his forces in surprising and defeating a party of Viking raiders. As the traditional emblem of the clan of a bee on a thistle flower, with the Gaelic motto:'E Labore Dulcedo' ["In labour, (we find) pleasure"], this device was not registered at the time it was devised in the mid-19th century. It was adopted, many think, incorrectly by clan Innes of Moray (who have no connection to clan MacInnes). This is still a matter of dispute as this badge is also claimed by the Innes clan. Refer to Clan MacInnes Association page for an explanation of how this occurred:

http://macinnes.org/crests/WhatHappenedTB.html

In 1960, a branch of the clan (whose ancestors were from Skye) matriculated arms from which was adopted the second crest and motto, arms of a Right Arm in Proper Tartan Holding a Bow, with the motto: GHIFT DHE AGUS AN RIGH, ["By the grace of God and king"]. This crest was adopted for use by the Council of Chiefs. Since there was no Clan Chief, the arms were lodged with Lord Lyon King of Arms.
This crest pertains to MacInneses of Skye - being that of the extended arm of an archer that relates "Sliochd Neill a’ bhogha", (The Line of Neil of the Bow), whose kin from the mid 16th century were hereditary bowman to Clan McKinnon of Strath. This registered device is now the commercially accepted crest and motto of the clan.

Another branch of the MacInneses who emigrated from Skye to settle in Nova Scotia in the 19th century named their farm Malagawatch. They too adopted the "arm & bow" crest and the motto as part of their amoral arms, as the registered Arms of MacInnes of Malagawatch.

In 2004, the International Association of Clan MacInnes (IACM) was granted Arms by the Court of Lord Lyon which incorporated the "arm & bow", with slight modifications, atop a wholly new coat of arms incorporating significant symbols related to the history of the clan. The new motto is MacAonghais a-rithist which means MacInnes again, a reference to the new effort to bring the clan back together. See the crest above.

The history of crests associated to Clan MacInnes are here.

http://macinnes.org/symbols.html#crests

Septs
In the context of Scottish clans, septs are families that followed another family's chief, or in this instance - part of the extended family and that hold a different surname. There are two septs of Clan MacInnes, the MacMasters of Ardgour and MacNeish. There are also many spelling variations of each as well as many spelling variations of MacInnes.   Here is a list on the macinnes.org web site but this list is not exhaustive.

Related names
There are many other Anglicised spellings of the Gaelic name 'mhic Aonghais', or MacInnes (McInnes), including... MacInnis, Macinnis, McInnis, McGinnis (not to be confused with McGuinness), McKinnis, McKinniss, MacAngus, McAninch, McIninch, McNinch, McKynes, M'Aneiss, McCanse, McCants, McNiesh, McAnsh, McAinsh, MacAngus - (along with others). There are 157 variants of the spelling of the name 'MacInnes'.

The name "Innes" is often linked to MacInnes. Clan Innes had a later origin in Moray and has no link to Clan MacInnes ancestrally. However, a number of those with the surname "MacInnes" may have dropped the "Mac", (in common with holders of other Mac- names), following the '45 when it was unfavourable to be identified as a Gaelic speaker. Likewise, those with the surname "Innes" may have added "Mac". You see the dilemma. Both the International Association of Clan MacInnes and the Clan Innes Society can assist you in your search. The International Association of Clan MacInnes is not an official clan organization and as such does not represent many international members of the clan as an American organization.

References

External links
http://www.electricscotland.com/webclans/m/macinne.html
https://macinnes.org/

Armigerous clans
Scottish clans